MS Pipe, MS Tube refers to Mild Steel Pipe or Mild Steel Tubes used for industrial and domestic use.

Use :
Structure
Shed,
Scaffolding,
Railing,
Stairs,
Tents,
Doors,
Industrial
Tools,
Trolleys,
Machinery,
Supports,
Barricading,
Poles,
Automobiles
Chassis,
Steering,
Tools,
Parts,
Domestic
Doors,
Railings,
Stairs,
Decoration,
Tents,
Fencing,
Furniture
Chairs,
Table,
Racks,
Storage System

See also
Pipe (fluid conveyance)
Piping
Plumbing
MS PIPE Full Form
Structural steel
Tubing (material)